Pseudonomoneura californica is a species of mydas flies (insects in the family Mydidae).

References

Mydidae
Articles created by Qbugbot
Insects described in 1950